Travis Bill Williams (January 5, 1892 – November 28, 1986) was a professional football player in the early 1920s. He played in the early National Football League for the Evansville Crimson Giants. Prior to playing pro football, Williams played at the college level at Indiana University.

References

1892 births
1986 deaths
Players of American football from Indiana
American football running backs
Indiana Hoosiers football players
Evansville Crimson Giants players
People from Boonville, Indiana